Nemertes may refer to:
one of the Nereids in Greek mythology
Nemertes Research, a technology research-advisory company
 Nemertes (worm), a genus of worms in the family Emplectonematidae